Hongqiao may refer to the following locations in China:

Literal meaning 
 Covered bridge (廊桥 or 虹桥 in Chinese), a kind of bridge which looks like a rainbow

Transport 
 Shanghai Hongqiao International Airport (上海虹桥国际机场), secondary airport of Shanghai, named after Hongqiao, Minhang District, Shanghai
 Shanghai Hongqiao railway station (上海虹桥站), one of major railway stations in Shanghai, named after Hongqiao Airport.
 Hongqiao Road station (虹桥路站), interchange station on the Shanghai Metro

Companies 
 Hongqiao Market, a shopping center in Beijing
 China Hongqiao Group, a Chinese aluminum manufacturer.

Districts 
 Hongqiao District (红桥区), Tianjin

Subdistricts 

 Hongqiao Subdistrict, Aksu (红桥街道), Xinjiang

Written as "洪桥街道"
 Hongqiao Subdistrict, Guangzhou (洪桥街道), in Yuexiu District
 Hongqiao Subdistrict, Qidong (洪桥街道), in Qidong County

Written as "虹桥街道"
 Hongqiao Subdistrict, Nantong, in Chongchuan District, Nantong, Jiangsu
 Hongqiao Subdistrict, Shanghai, in Changning District, named after Hongqiao Road in Shanghai.
 Hongqiao Subdistrict, Wusu, Xinjiang
 Hongqiao Subdistrict, Xuanwei, Yunnan

Towns 
 Hongqiao, Jiang'an County (红桥镇), Sichuan
 Hongqiao, Changxing County (洪桥镇), Zhejiang

Written as "虹桥镇"

 Hongqiao, Hebei, in Yutian County
 Hongqiao, Pingjiang, in Pingjiang County, Hunan province.
 Hongqiao, Taixing, Jiangsu
 Hongqiao, Minhang District, Shanghai
 Hongqiao, Yueqing, Zhejiang

Townships 

 Hongqiao Township, Yunnan (红桥乡), in Ninglang Yi Autonomous County
Written as "虹桥乡"
 Hongqiao Township, Jiangxi, in Yanshan County
 Hongqiao Township, Sichuan, in Wanyuan